Sneaker Freaker is an independent magazine and website that covers sneakers, streetwear, and sneaker culture. Started in Melbourne, the magazine reaches a global audience through print and online channels.

History
Sneaker Freaker was launched in October 2002 and was originally conceived as a means for its founder and editor, Simon ‘Woody’ Wood, to get free shoes. The magazine is sold in more than 40 countries and has offices in Melbourne, London and Berlin. Sneakerfreaker.com provides sneaker news, opinion pieces, and other content .

Publishing 
In 2018, Sneaker Freaker published its 40th issue.

In late 2018, Sneaker Freaker published The Ultimate Sneaker Book with Taschen. The 700 page book serves as an anthology of Sneaker Freaker magazine and the last 100 years of collaborations, key releases, and notable events that have shaped the industry.

Sneaker Freaker has also published books with Nike, Globe, Adidas, New Balance, Reebok, G-SHOCK, PONY, and Puma.

Product Collaborations

See also 

 Benjamin Kapelushnik
 Sneaker collecting

References

External links 

 Official website

2002 establishments in Australia
Biannual magazines published in Australia
English-language magazines
Fashion magazines
Hip hop fashion
Independent magazines
Magazines established in 2002
Spanish-language magazines
Magazines published in Melbourne
Sneaker culture